Miguel Alberto Fernandes Marques (born 7 June 1963), known simply as Miguel, is a Portuguese retired footballer who played as a central defender.

Club career
Miguel was born in Guimarães. From 1984 to 1997 he competed in 13 Primeira Liga seasons, with Vitória de Guimarães, Sporting CP and Gil Vicente FC, amassing totals of 327 matches and 12 goals and being relegated in the last year while at the service of the latter club.

Miguel retired in June 2006 at the age of 43, after not being able to help Grupo Desportivo União Torcatense avoid relegation from the third division. He earned five caps for Portugal in the late 80s, the vast majority of those coming after the infamous Saltillo Affair at the 1986 FIFA World Cup, which caused most of the squad to defect from international play.

References

External links

1963 births
Living people
Sportspeople from Guimarães
Portuguese footballers
Association football defenders
Primeira Liga players
Liga Portugal 2 players
Segunda Divisão players
Vitória S.C. players
Moreirense F.C. players
F.C. Vizela players
Sporting CP footballers
Gil Vicente F.C. players
C.D. Trofense players
Portugal international footballers